Keith Stanley Rae (30 July 1917 – 23 December 2021) was an Australian rules footballer who played with Carlton and Richmond in the Victorian Football League (VFL).

Family
The son of Stanley Rae (1893-1968), and Ruby Adele Rae (1893-1983), née Pilling, Keith Stanley Rae was born at Williamstown, Victoria on 30 July 1917.

He married Joan McCarthy (1931-1984) on 14 April 1950.

Education
He attended Footscray Technical School and did a welding course at the Williamstown Dockyards.

Football

Williamstown (VFA)
Recruited from the Williamstown Seconds in 1937, he played three seasons for the Williamstown Football Club.

Carlton (VFL)
He was spotted by Carlton's recruiter Newton Chandler whilst playing for Williamstown, and was invited to try out for the Carlton team as a wingman or centre. After playing two games for Carlton in 1939, he joined the Navy.

Richmond (VFL)
He moved to Richmond in 1946, and played in two First XVIII games, scoring one goal, and in fourteen Second XVIII games, including the 1946 Second's Grand Final.

Military service
During World War Two he served in the Royal Australian Navy. In June 1942, Rae was on board when HMAS Nestor  was attacked and sunk in the Mediterranean.<ref>[https://www.navy.gov.au/hmas-nestor HMAS Nestor, "navy.gov.au.]</ref> He survived, and returned to Australia in 1943.

Cricket
He was also a talented junior cricketer.

Oldest living former VFL footballer
Following the death of Ken Feltscheer in December 2017, Rae became the oldest living former VFL footballer.

Death
Rae died at Rosebud, Victoria on 23 December 2021, at the age of 104.

 Notes 

References
 World War Two Nominal Roll: Leading Seaman Keith Stanley Rae (W/1114), Department of Veterans' Affairs.
 World War Service Record: Leading Seaman Keith Stanley Rae (W/1114), National Archives of Australia.
 Hogan P: The Tigers Of Old'', Richmond FC, (Melbourne), 1996.

External links 
 
 
 Keith Rae's playing statistics at The VFA Project
 Keith Rae's profile at Blueseum
 

1917 births
2021 deaths
Australian centenarians
Australian rules footballers from Melbourne
Carlton Football Club players
Men centenarians
Richmond Football Club players
Royal Australian Navy personnel of World War II
Williamstown Football Club players
People from Williamstown, Victoria
Military personnel from Melbourne